Rick Sloan (born November 10, 1946) is an American athlete. He competed in the men's decathlon at the 1968 Summer Olympics.

References

1946 births
Living people
Athletes (track and field) at the 1968 Summer Olympics
American male decathletes
Olympic track and field athletes of the United States
Sportspeople from Fullerton, California